State Route 100 (SR 100) is a state highway in the U.S. state of Maine, running from Portland to Bangor.

The south end of SR 100 is at the intersection of Forest Avenue and Cumberland Avenue in downtown Portland. Its north end is at the intersection of Hammond Street, Main Street, State Street and Central Street in downtown Bangor; SR 100 runs along Hammond Street with U.S. Route 2 (US 2) which continues across Main Street/Central Street onto State Street.

The majority of SR 100 is concurrent with other routes: US 302 from downtown Portland to northern Portland, SR 26 from northern Portland to Gray, US 202 from Gray to Augusta, US 201 from Augusta to Fairfield, SR 11 from Fairfield to Newport, and US 2 from Newport to downtown Bangor. The only parts of SR 100 that do not run along another route are in Portland, first between its southern terminus and the Interstate 295/US 1 interchange (where US 302 begins) and between US 302 and SR 26 where it is alone on a small piece of Allen Avenue.

Major junctions

Alternate route

State Route 100A (SR 100A) is a  alternate route of SR 100 running between the towns of Winslow and Benton.

Route 100A's alignment was formerly part of SR 32, before SR 32 was truncated in 1954 to end at SR 137 Business, near its intersection with US 201/SR 100 just south of SR 100A's current terminus.  The old alignment, which connected to SR 100 at both ends, was redesignated as SR 100A (as a bypass of SR 100's alignment in Winslow and Benton).

References

External links

Floodgap Roadgap's RoadsAroundME: Maine State Route 100

100
Transportation in Cumberland County, Maine
Transportation in Androscoggin County, Maine
Transportation in Kennebec County, Maine
Transportation in Somerset County, Maine
Transportation in Waldo County, Maine
Transportation in Penobscot County, Maine